Andrew Lazar (born 1966) is an American film producer and graduate of the New York University Tisch School of the Arts. He is associated with Mad Chance Productions, a production company he formed in 1997 and affiliated with Warner Bros., but also has projects involved with other studios. Lazar is of Jewish descent.

Filmography
He was a producer in all films unless otherwise noted.

Film

Thanks

Television

Thanks

References

External links
 

1966 births
Living people
American film producers
20th-century American Jews
Tisch School of the Arts alumni
21st-century American Jews